Artemus (also, Nip and Tuck) is an unincorporated community and census-designated place in Knox County, Kentucky, United States. As of the 2010 United States Census the population was 590.

Geography
It sits on the north side of the Cumberland River. Kentucky Route 225 passes through the center of town, leading northwest to Barbourville and south  to Kentucky Route 92 in Bell County.

Climate
The climate in this area is characterized by hot, humid summers and generally mild to cool winters.  According to the Köppen Climate Classification system, Artemus has a humid subtropical climate, abbreviated "Cfa" on climate maps.

Demographics

As of the 2010 census, there were 590 people, 233 households, and 163 families residing in the CDP. There were 282 housing units, of which 49, or 17.4%, were vacant. The racial makeup of the CDP was 96.9% white, 0.8% African American, 0.2% Native American, 0.2% Asian, 1.2% some other race, and 0.7% from two or more races. 1.5% of the population were Hispanic or Latino of any race.

Of the 233 households in the CDP, 34.8% had children under the age of 18 living with them, 46.8% were headed by married couples living together, 16.7% had a female householder with no husband present, and 30.0% were non-families. 28.3% of all households were made up of individuals, and 12.4% were someone living alone who was 65 years of age or older. The average household size was 2.53, and the average family size was 3.10.

24.4% of residents in the CDP were under the age of 18, 10.9% were from age 18 to 24, 23.6% were from 25 to 44, 24.6% were from 45 to 64, and 16.4% were 65 years of age or older. The median age was 38.8 years. For every 100 females, there were 96.0 males. For every 100 females age 18 and over, there were 90.6 males.

For the period 2013–17, the estimated median annual income for a household was $55,057, and the median income for a family was $55,922.  The per capita income for the CDP was $20,829.

References

Census-designated places in Knox County, Kentucky
Census-designated places in Kentucky
Coal towns in Kentucky